Mera Maan Rakhna is a Pakistani television family drama serial that aired on TV One on 8 July 2020. It is produced by Rafiq Ahmed Chaudhry under RC Films. It stars Sania Saeed, Saman Ansari, Wahaj Ali, and Maryam Fatima in lead roles.

Cast
Sania Saeed as Momina
Wahaj Ali as Mohid
Maryam Fatima as Muqaddas 
Alyy Khan as Sajjad
Sukaina Khan as Amal
Saad Qureshi as Asad
Haris Waheed as Sheraaz
Sangeeta as Farida, Muqaddas's grandmother
Jia Ali as Samina
Saman Ansari as Fozia
Mojiz Hasan as Faris
Farhan Ally Agha
Tara Mahmood
Dania Anwar
Agha Sajjad
Shareef Baloch
Amir Shah
Ammara Saeed

Soundtrack
The OST was composed by Naved Nashad whereas the lyrics were penned down by Khalilullah Farooqui and Madiha Fasahat.

References

External links

2020 Pakistani television series debuts
2020 Pakistani television series endings